The sea otter (Enhydra lutris) is a marine mammal that primarily lives on the northern coasts of the Pacific Ocean.

Other species in the otter subfamily (Lutrinae) are sometimes mistakenly referred to as "sea otters" when seen near coastal areas. These include the Eurasian otter (Lutra lutra) and the North American river otter (Lontra canadensis)

Sea otter may also refer to:

Sea Otter Classic, a bicycling sports festival in Monterey, California, in the United States
Sea Otter Cove, a remote place near the north-western end of Vancouver Island in British Columbia, Canada 
Sea Otter Rocks, rocks of the Commander Islands in the Bering Sea
Supermarine Sea Otter, a British flying boat of the late 1930s and 1940s
, a United States Navy patrol boat in commission from 1917 to 1919
,  a United States Navy experimental auxiliary ship in commission from July to November 1941
, a United States Navy experimental auxiliary ship in commission from 1941 to 1942

See also
Otter (disambiguation)